Basketball is a sport in which a ball is bounced and thrown through a hoop.

Basketball may also refer to:

 Basketball (ball), the ball used in the sport

Gaming
 Basketball (1974 video game), also known as TV Basketball, a game by Taito
 Basketball (1978 video game), a game for the Atari 2600
 Basketball (1980 video game), a game for the Intellivision system

Television and film
 "Basketball" (The Office), an episode of the U.S. version of The Office
 "Basketball", an episode of the television series Teletubbies
 BASEketball, a 1998 comedy American film

Music
 "Basketball" (song), a song by Kurtis Blow, notably covered by Lil' Bow Wow
 Basketball, a minor musical side project of Adam Young, Andy Johnson, and Anthony Johnson

Other
 "Basketball", a successor project to the U.S. government's Total Information Awareness surveillance program  
 Basket-Ball (magazine), a magazine published by the French Federation of Basketball

See also